Alan Edward Law Britton (3 December 1922 – 20 May 2012) was a New Zealand cricketer. He played in eighteen first-class matches for Canterbury from 1945 to 1953.

Life and career
Britton was born in Christchurch and attended Christchurch Boys' High School. He served in the Royal New Zealand Air Force in World War II. He continued to serve in the Territorial Air Force until 1977, when he retired with the rank of squadron leader.

He played as a wicket-keeper and useful lower-order batsman for Canterbury for five seasons. He was their keeper when they won the Plunket Shield in his first season, 1945–46, and again when they won in 1951–52.

Britton was a schoolteacher. He was the founding principal of Hornby High School in Christchurch in 1975.

See also
 List of Canterbury representative cricketers

References

External links
 

1922 births
2012 deaths
People educated at Christchurch Boys' High School
New Zealand military personnel of World War II
New Zealand cricketers
Canterbury cricketers
Cricketers from Christchurch
New Zealand schoolteachers